"A Temple of the Holy Ghost" is a short story by Flannery O'Connor. It was written in 1953 and published in 1955 in her short story collection A Good Man Is Hard to Find and is one of O'Connor's few explicitly Catholic stories. A devout Roman Catholic, O'Connor often used religious themes in her work, but more commonly described rural Southern Protestants as her main characters.

Plot summary 
The story is told from the perspective of a 12-year-old girl and involves a visit from a pair of her 14-year-old cousins, Roman Catholic convent school girls who are mostly interested in clothes and boys. The young girl's mother arranges for a pair of neighborhood boys who are training to be preachers to accompany the girl's two cousins to a fair but does not allow the 12-year-old to join them. While picking up the girls, the boys are mildly ridiculed by them for their Protestant Church of God views. At the fair, the girls see a hermaphrodite displayed as a freak, which they later describe to their younger cousin, saying that the hermaphrodite "lifted his skirt to show what was underneath." The hermaphrodite explained that this was how God made him or her. The end of the story may deal with the acceptance of God's will as in the case of the hermaphrodite.

See also
Tantum ergo

References

Short stories by Flannery O'Connor
1954 short stories
Southern Gothic short stories